Dwight Martin Basden (born October 28, 1972) is a Bermudian cricketer. He plays as a right-handed opening batsman and has represented Bermuda at One Day International Cricket.

External links

1972 births
Bermuda One Day International cricketers
Bermudian cricketers
Living people
Bermuda cricket captains